Darreh Zhan-e Bala (also Romanized as Darreh Zhān-e Bālā and Darreh Zhān Bālā; also known as Darīzhān ‘Olyā, Darreh Zhān, Darreh Zhan ‘Olyā and Dīzhān-e ‘Olyā) is a village in Zhan Rural District, in the Central District of Dorud County, Lorestan Province, Iran. At the 2006 census, its population was 295, in 72 families.

References 

Towns and villages in Dorud County